Richard Duane Kelton (April 29, 1943 – November 27, 1978) was an American actor.

Life and career
Kelton was born in Lincoln, Nebraska. After briefly attending Northeastern Oklahoma A&M College in 1963, he transferred to The University of Kansas, earning his bachelor's degree in drama 1966, and then his Masters' two years later, in 1968. He returned briefly in 1973 to appear in a campus production. He made his way to California where he made his debut playing "Bud" in an episode of Gunsmoke. In 1967, he made his film debut with a small part in the movie In Cold Blood (1967) as Nancy's boyfriend. Soon after arriving in California with his wife in 1970, he got guest-starring roles in The Young Rebels and The Waltons.

Soon afterwards, he made his TV movie debut as "Lieutenant Charring" in Wild Women (1970). He continued in numerous other guest starring roles and movie roles. He also played the role of "Nick" in the Broadway revival of Who's Afraid Of Virginia Woolf? in 1976.

After returning to California in 1976, he had a guest-starring role on ABC-TV's Charlie's Angels. He played the role of alien science officer "Ficus Pandorata" on the short-lived NBC-TV science fiction series Quark (1978). Later that year he was invited back to The University of Kansas to give a short seminar on films.

Death
Kelton died of accidental carbon monoxide asphyxiation due to a faulty heater in his trailer while filming the NBC-TV miniseries Centennial, in which he was to have co-starred. Universal Studios, which produced the TV miniseries, was fined $720 for the failure to provide a proper ventilation system for the trailer to which Kelton had retreated to rehearse his lines.

Legacy
His alma mater, KU, established the Richard Kelton Memorial Fund in December 1978 to aid student actors in their professional acting aspirations. The fund still exists today in the form of the Richard Kelton Memorial Scholarship, that provides scholarships for undergraduate students majoring in theatre with an emphasis in acting.

Filmography

References

External links

1943 births
1978 deaths
Actors from Lincoln, Nebraska
People from Miami, Oklahoma
Male actors from Oklahoma
American male film actors
American male stage actors
American male television actors
Accidental deaths in Colorado
Deaths from carbon monoxide poisoning
20th-century American male actors